Michael Rand Allsup (born March 8, 1947) is an American guitarist, best known as a member of the rock and roll band Three Dog Night.

Background

Allsup's parents were originally from Oklahoma, but relocated to the small town of Empire, California. Allsup became interested in a guitar in his teens and started his musical career by playing in a dance band with some friends from high school. He played in numerous local bands before relocating to Los Angeles in 1968, where he met a trio of vocalists (Danny Hutton, Chuck Negron, and Cory Wells), who had a recording contract with Dunhill Records and were looking for backing musicians. Allsup joined their new band, Three Dog Night, which became successful in the late 1960s thru the mid-1970s. Allsup left the band in early-mid 1975 to form his own band, SS Fools, with former Three Dog Night members Joe Schermie and Floyd Sneed, along with Stan Seymore, Wayne DeVillier, Bobby Kimball, and Jon Smith, to little success. In 2015, he was touring with Three Dog Night, with band co-founder Danny Hutton.

References

External links

1947 births
Living people
American rock guitarists
American male guitarists
Three Dog Night members
20th-century American guitarists
21st-century American guitarists
20th-century American male musicians
21st-century American male musicians